Wytheville Community College (WCC) is a public community college in Wytheville, Virginia. It is part of the Virginia Community College System (VCCS) and opened in 1963 as a two-year branch of Virginia Polytechnic Institute & State University. WCC joined the VCCS when it was formed in 1967. The college serves the citizens of Bland, Carroll, Grayson, Smyth (Marion and eastward), and Wythe counties, and the City of Galax.

WCC offers nearly thirty academic programs, which include university parallel programs (transfer), occupational-technical programs, and health professions programs. The college awards the associate degree, diplomas, and certificates.

External links
 Official website

Virginia Community College System
Educational institutions established in 1963
Universities and colleges accredited by the Southern Association of Colleges and Schools
Education in Wythe County, Virginia
1963 establishments in Virginia